Aneta Beata Kręglicka (born 23 March 1965) is a Polish dancer and beauty queen who won the Miss World 1989 contest on 22 November 1989 in Hong Kong, representing Poland. She became the first woman from Poland to win the title and the oldest titleholder when she was crowned on 22 November 1989, at the age of  before Karolina Bielawska won the said pageant in 2021.

Early life 
She was born in Szczecin. She studied economics at Gdańsk University and began graduate studies at SGH Warsaw School of Economics in Poland. She was a member of the contemporary dance group at Gdańsk University before entering the Miss Poland pageant.

Miss World 
In July 1989, she was crowned as Miss Polonia 1989. In September she traveled to Japan to represent her country at Miss International 1989, almost winning the crown for Poland, becoming the first runner-up to Iris Klein of Germany.

After this experience, she had to prepare immediately for Miss World, held in Hong Kong, and on 22 November 1989 won the title of Miss World 1989.  For a year she traveled the world, fulfilling her obligations and helping the Miss World Organization with their charitable causes.

Life after Miss World 
In 2006, she took part in the third season of the Polish version of Dancing With The Stars. She was also one of the judges at Miss World 2006, held in Poland that year.

She has one son, Aleksander, with her husband, director Maciej Żak.

References 

Living people
1965 births
University of Gdańsk alumni
Miss World winners
Miss World 1989 delegates
Polish beauty pageant winners
Models from Szczecin
Miss International 1989 delegates
SGH Warsaw School of Economics alumni
Polish female dancers
Miss Polonia winners